Segbohoué is a town is lower western Benin.  It lies on a coastal lake.

Transport 

It is the terminus of a branch railway from the capital.

See also 

 Railway stations in Benin.

References 

Populated places in Benin